Connie Wanek (born June 1, 1952) is an American poet.

Life
She was born in Madison, Wisconsin, and grew up in Las Cruces, New Mexico. In 1989, she moved with her family to Duluth, Minnesota. She now divides her time between Minnesota and New Mexico.

Her work appeared in Poetry, The Atlantic Monthly, The Virginia Quarterly Review, Quarterly West, Poetry East, Prairie Schooner, and Missouri Review.

She has published four books of poetry, one book of short prose, and served as co-editor (with Joyce Sutphen and Thom Tammaro) of the comprehensive historical anthology of Minnesota women poets, called To Sing Along the Way (New Rivers Press, 2006). Ted Kooser, Poet Laureate of the United States (2004–2006), named her a Witter Bynner Fellow of the Library of Congress for 2006.

Awards
 Willow Poetry Prize
 Jane Kenyon Poetry Prize.
 2006 Witter Bynner Fellowship of the Library of Congress by United States Poet Laureate Ted Kooser.
 2009 George Morrison Artist of the Year

Work
 
 
 
 
 
 Consider the Lilies: Mrs. God Poems. 2018. ISBN 978-1-7220805-0-1.
 Marshmallow Clouds: Two Poets At Play Among Figures Of Speech. (w/Ted Kooser, Illustrator: Richard Jones) 2022. ISBN 978-1536203035.

Anthologies

References

External links
 "Author's website"
 "Leftovers", Narrative, Winter 2008
 
 

Writers from Madison, Wisconsin
Writers from Duluth, Minnesota
Poets from Wisconsin
1952 births
Living people
American women poets
People from Las Cruces, New Mexico
Poets from Minnesota
Poets from New Mexico
20th-century American poets
20th-century American women writers
21st-century American poets
21st-century American women writers